National Socialist Party of America v. Village of Skokie, 432 U.S. 43 (1977), arising out of what is sometimes referred to as the Skokie Affair, was a landmark decision of the US Supreme Court dealing with freedom of speech and freedom of assembly. This case is considered a "classic" free speech case in constitutional law classes. Related court decisions are captioned Skokie v. NSPA, Collin v. Smith, and Smith v. Collin. The Supreme Court ruled 5–4, per curiam. The Supreme Court's 1977 ruling granted certiorari and reversed and remanded the Illinois Supreme Court's denial to lift the lower court's injunction on the NSPA's march. In other words: the courts decided a person's assertion that speech is being restrained must be reviewed immediately by the judiciary. By requiring the state court to consider the neo-Nazis' appeal without delay, the U.S. Supreme Court decision opened the door to allowing the National Socialist Party of America to march.

Background
Before the Skokie Affair, Frank Collin and his neo-Nazi group, the NSPA, would regularly hold demonstrations in Marquette Park, where the NSPA was headquartered. However, the Chicago authorities would eventually block these plans by requiring the NSPA to post a $350,000 public safety insurance bond and by banning political demonstrations in Marquette Park. While Collin did file a lawsuit against the City of Chicago for a violation against his first amendment rights, he realized that this case would get tied up in the courts for far longer than he was willing to wait to begin marching again.

On October 4, 1976, Collin sent out letters to the park districts of the North Shore suburbs of Chicago, requesting permits for the NSPA to hold a white power demonstration. While some suburbs chose to ignore their letter, Skokie—home to a significant number of Jewish people, many of them survivors of the Holocaust—chose to respond. At first, the Skokie mayor and Village Council intended to allow the NSPA to demonstrate; the village's tactic was to ignore them, in order to give the NSPA as little publicity as possible. The Jewish community found this unacceptable and held meetings throughout the month of April to discuss the matter. The mayor and the Village Council heard their concerns and on April 27, 1977, ordered village attorney, Harvey Schwartz, to seek an injunction.

In addition to filing for an injunction, the Village of Skokie passed three ordinances on May 2, 1977 to prevent any future event like the NSPA's request. One states that people could not wear military-style uniforms during demonstrations. The two other ordinances prohibited the distribution of material containing hate speech and a required a $350,000 insurance bond to hold a demonstration. These ordinances rendered it impossible for the NSPA to be able to hold the event.

Collin used both the injunction and ordinances as an opportunity to claim infringement upon his First Amendment rights and subsequently wanted to protest in Skokie for the NSPA's right to free speech. On March 20, 1977, Collin notified the Chief of Police and Park District of the NSPA's intentions to protest for their right to free speech on May 1. In the letters, he stated that about 30–50 members planned to demonstrate outside of the Village Hall from about 3–3:30 p.m. and they planned to hold up signs demanding free speech for white men, including the phrases "White Free Speech", "Free Speech for White Americans", and "Free Speech for the White Men".

Collin would send another letter on June 22, 1977 with the same details for a protest planned for July 4 from 12:00–12:30pm.

Preceding lower court cases
The case began in the local Cook County court, when the Village government successfully sued, under the caption Village of Skokie v. NSPA, for an injunction to bar the demonstration. On April 28, 1977, village attorney Schwartz filed suit in the Circuit Court of Cook County for an emergency injunction against the march to be held on May 1, 1977. The injunction was granted, prohibiting marchers at the proposed Skokie rally from wearing Nazi uniforms or displaying swastikas. On behalf of the NSPA, the American Civil Liberties Union (ACLU) challenged the injunction. The ACLU assigned civil rights attorneys David Goldberger  and Burton Joseph to Collin's cases. The ACLU argued that the injunction violated the First Amendment rights of the marchers to express themselves. The ACLU challenge was unsuccessful at the lower court level.

The ACLU appealed on behalf of NSPA, but both the Illinois Appellate Court and the Illinois Supreme Court refused to expedite the case or to stay the injunction. The ACLU then appealed that refusal to the Supreme Court of the United States.

Supreme Court ruling and subsequent cases
On June 14, 1977, the Supreme Court ordered Illinois to hold a hearing on their ruling against the National Socialist Party of America, emphasizing that "if a State seeks to impose a restraint on First Amendment rights, it must provide strict procedural safeguards, including immediate appellate review. ... Absent such review, the State must instead allow a stay. The order of the Illinois Supreme Court constituted a denial of that right." On remand, the Illinois Supreme Court sent the case back to the Illinois Appellate Court. The Appellate Court ruled per curiam on July 11, 1977 that the swastika was not protected by the First Amendment. In other words, the NSPA could march, but they could not display the swastika during their march.

In its full review of the case, the Illinois Supreme Court focused on the First Amendment implications of the display of the swastika. Skokie attorneys argued that for Holocaust survivors, seeing the swastika was like being physically attacked. The state supreme court rejected that argument, ruling that display of the swastika is a symbolic form of free speech entitled to First Amendment protections and determined that the swastika itself did not constitute "fighting words". Its ruling allowed the National Socialist Party of America to march.

In parallel litigation in the federal courts, under the caption Collin v. Smith, the village's ordinance was declared unconstitutional, first by the district court and then by divided vote of the Seventh Circuit court of appeals. Over a published dissent by Justice Blackmun (joined by Justice White) giving a detailed history of the case and an overview of the issues involved, the U.S. Supreme Court denied further review.

Effect of the decision
In the summer of 1978, in response to the Supreme Court's decision, some Holocaust survivors set up a museum on the Main Street of Skokie to commemorate those who had died in the concentration camps. The Illinois Holocaust Museum and Education Center remains open today, having been moved to a new permanent location on Woods Drive in 2009.

Ultimately, the NSPA failed to carry through its march in Skokie, marching in Chicago instead when they had gained permission. From a legal point of view, the litigation left undecided, at the Supreme Court level, whether such older precedents as Beauharnais v. Illinois and Terminiello v. Chicago remain authoritative statements of how the First Amendment applies to provocative and intimidating hate speech expressing fascist or racist ideas. According to Nadine Strossen, the case was part of a gradual process in the 20th century where the Court strengthened First Amendment protections and narrowed down the application of earlier decisions which upheld restrictions of free speech, in part due to the realisation that the Illinois restrictions on Nazi "hate speech" were so broad they could have been equally used to prohibit Martin Luther King Jr. demonstrations in Skokie.

Cultural reference
This case is obliquely referenced in the 1980 film The Blues Brothers. In the film a scene where Jake Blues asks a State Trooper "Hey, what's going on?" to which the reply is "Ah those bums' won their court case so they're marching today." To which Jake asks "What bums?" To which the State Trooper replies "The Fucking Nazi Party". Jake and Elwood then surmise aloud "Ilinois Nazis. I hate Illinois Nazis" Elwood Blues then proceeds to drive the car he and Jake are in at speed towards the march which is stationary and on formation, located on a bridge, causing the troop to jump off the bridge and into the body of water below the bridge.

See also
 Skokie (film)
 List of United States Supreme Court cases, volume 432
 List of United States Supreme Court cases
 List of United States Supreme Court cases by the Burger Court
 List of United States Supreme Court cases involving the First Amendment
 Beauharnais v. Illinois, 
 Brandenburg v. Ohio, 
 R.A.V. v. City of St. Paul, 
 Virginia v. Black,

References

Further reading

External links
 
 Chronology of Events

 
1977 in United States case law
June 1977 events in the United States
American Civil Liberties Union litigation
History of racism in the United States
Jews and Judaism in Chicago
Neo-Nazism in the United States
United States Free Speech Clause case law
United States Supreme Court cases
United States Supreme Court cases of the Burger Court